John Gordon Melton (born September 19, 1942) is an American religious scholar who was the founding director of the Institute for the Study of American Religion and is currently the Distinguished Professor of American Religious History with the Institute for Studies of Religion at Baylor University in Waco, Texas, where he resides. He is also an ordained minister in the United Methodist Church.

Melton is the author of more than forty-five books, including several encyclopedias, handbooks, and scholarly textbooks on American religious history, Methodism, world religions, and new religious movements (NRMs). His areas of research include major religious traditions, American Methodism, new and alternative religions, Western Esotericism (popularly called occultism) and parapsychology, New Age, and Dracula and vampire studies.

Early life
Melton was born in Birmingham, Alabama, the son of Burnum Edgar Melton and Inez Parker. During his senior year in high school he came across The Small Sects in America by Elmer T. Clark and became interested in reading as much as possible on alternative religions.

In 1964 he graduated from Birmingham Southern College with the B.A. degree and then proceeded to theological studies at Garrett-Evangelical Theological Seminary, from which he received an M.Div. with a concentration in church history in 1968. He married Dorothea Dudley in 1966, with one daughter, Melanie. The marriage ended in divorce in 1979. His second wife is named Suzie.

Main areas of research

Christian countercult and secular anti-cult
In his Encyclopedic Handbook of Cults in America Melton drew a distinction between the Christian countercult and the secular anti-cult movements, he articulated the distinction on the grounds that the two movements operate with very different epistemologies, motives and methods.  This distinction has been subsequently acknowledged by sociologists such as Douglas E. Cowan and Eileen Barker.

Vampirism research
From his college days, Melton developed an interest in the subject of vampires, which he has since pursued in his leisure time. 

In 1997, Melton, Massimo Introvigne and Elizabeth Miller organized an event at the Westin Hotel in Los Angeles where 1,500 attendees (some dressed as vampires) came for a "creative writing contest, Gothic rock music and theatrical performances."

Aum Shinrikyo investigation 

In May 1995, during the investigation into the sarin gas attack on the Tokyo subway, the group responsible for the attack, Aum Shinrikyo, contacted an American group known as AWARE (Association of World Academics for Religious Education), founded by American scholar James R. Lewis, claiming that the human rights of its members were being violated. Lewis recruited Melton, human rights lawyer Barry Fisher, and chemical expert Thomas Banigan. They flew to Japan, with their travel expenses paid by Aum, and announced that they will investigate and report through press conferences at the end of their trip.

In the press conferences, Fisher and Lewis announced that Aum could not have produced the sarin with which the attacks had been committed. They had determined this, Lewis said, with their technical expert, based on  photos and documents provided by the group.

British scholar of Japanese religions Ian Reader, in a detailed account of the incident, reported that Melton "had few doubts by the end of his visit to Japan of Aum’s complicity" and eventually "concluded that Aum had in fact been involved in the attack and other crimes" In fact, the Washington Post account of the final press conference mentioned Lewis and Fisher but not Melton. 

Lewis, on the other hand, maintained his opinion that Aum had been framed, and wrote that having the trip funded by Aum had been arranged "so that financial considerations would not be attached to our final report."

Reader concluded that, "The visit was well-intentioned, and the participants were genuinely concerned about possible violations of civil rights in the wake of the extensive police investigations and detentions of followers." However, it was ill-fated and detrimental to the reputation of those involved. While distinguishing between Lewis' and Melton's attitudes, Reader observed that Melton was criticized as well by both Japanese media and some fellow scholars. Using stronger words, Canadian scholar Stephen A. Kent chastised both Lewis and Melton for having put the reputation of the whole category of scholars of new religious movements at risk.

Criticism
Melton's scholarly works concentrate on the phenomenology and not the theology of NRMs. Some Christian countercultists criticize Melton for not critiquing the groups he reports on from an evangelical perspective, arguing that his failure to do so is incompatible with his statements of professed evangelicalism. Some secular anti-cultists who feel that new religious movements are dangerous and that scholars should actively work against them have likewise criticized him. Stephen A. Kent and Theresa Krebs, for example, characterized Gordon Melton, James R. Lewis, and Anson Shupe as biased towards the groups they study.

Bibliography

Books
 Log Cabins to Steeples:  The United Methodist Way in Illinois (Nashville:  Parthenon Press, 1974).
 A Directory of Religious Bodies in the United States (New York: Garland, 1977).
 An Old Catholic Sourcebook (co-authored with Karl Pruter), (New York/London: Garland, 1982).
 An Open Letter Concerning the Local Church, Witness Lee and The God-Men Controversy (Santa Barbara: The Institute for the Study of American Religion, 1985)
 Magic, witchcraft, and paganism in America: A bibliography, compiled from the files of the Institute for the Study of American Religion, (New York: Garland Publishing,1982), . Revised edition co-authored with Isotta Poggi, Garland, 1992.
 The Cult Experience: Responding to the New Religious Pluralism (co-authored with Robert L. Moore), (New York: Pilgrim Press, 1982).
 Why Cults Succeed Where The Church Fails (co-authored with Ronald M. Enroth), (Elgin: Brethren Press, 1985).
 Encyclopedic Handbook of Cults in America (New York/London: Garland, 1986; revised edition, Garland, 1992).
 Biographical Dictionary of American Cult and Sect Leaders (New York/London: Garland, 1986).
 American Religious Creeds (Detroit: Gale, 1988; republished in three volumes, New York: Triumph Books, 1991).
 New Age Almanac, (co-edited with Jerome Clark and Aidan Kelly) (Detroit: Visible Ink, 1991).
 Perspectives on the New Age (co-edited with James R. Lewis), (Albany: State University of New York Press, 1992).
 Islam in North America: A Sourcebook (co-edited with Michael A. Koszegi), (New York/London: Garland, 1992).
 Sex, Slander, and Salvation: Investigating The Family/Children of God (co-edited with James R. Lewis), (Stanford: Center for Academic Publication, 1994).
 Encyclopedia of Occultism and Parapsychology editor, 4th ed (Gale, 1996) ; 5th ed (Gale 2001) 
 Finding Enlightenment: Ramtha's School of Ancient Wisdom, Beyond Words Publishing, Inc. Hillsboro Oregon,  (1998).
 American Religions: An Illustrated History (Santa Barbara: ABC-CLIO, 2000).
 The Church of Scientology (Studies in Contemporary Religions, 1), Signature Books (August 1, 2000), 80pp.
 The Vampire Book: The Encyclopedia of the Undead, 
 Prime-Time Religion: An Encyclopedia of Religious Broadcasting (co-authored with Phillip Charles Lucas & Jon R. Stone). Oryx, 1997.
 Melton's Encyclopedia of American Religions, Thomson Gale; 8th edition (February 13, 2009), 1416pp, 
 Cults, Religion, and Violence, David Bromley and Gordon Melton, Eds., Cambridge University Press (May 13, 2002), 272pp, 
 Religions of the World: A Comprehensive Encyclopedia of Beliefs and Practices, ABC-Clio (September, 2002), 1200pp, 
 J. Gordon Melton, 'The counter-cult monitoring movement in historical perspective' in Challenging Religion: Essays in Honour of Eileen Barker, James A. Beckford and James T. Richardson, eds. (London: Routledge, 2003), 102-113.
 Encyclopedia Of Protestantism, Facts on File Publishing (May 30, 2005), 628pp, 
 A Will to Choose: The Origins of African American Methodism (New York: Rowman & Littlefield Publishers, 2007)
 The Vampire Almanac: The Complete History, Visible Ink Press (October 5, 2021), 736pp,

See also
 List of new religious movement and cult researchers

References

1942 births
Living people
21st-century American historians
21st-century American male writers
American religion academics
American religious writers
Birmingham–Southern College alumni
CESNUR
Garrett–Evangelical Theological Seminary alumni
Contributors to the Encyclopædia Britannica
Writers from Santa Barbara, California
Researchers of new religious movements and cults
University of California, Santa Barbara faculty
Vampirism
Writers from Alabama
American United Methodist clergy
World Christianity scholars
Historians from California
American male non-fiction writers